CUMT may refer to:

 China University of Mining and Technology in Xuzhou, Jiangsu
 Chung Hwa University of Medical Technology in Tainan, Taiwan